The Judo competition of the 2008 Summer Paralympics was held in Beijing Workers' Gymnasium from September 7 to September 9. There were 13 events, corresponding to seven weight classes for men and six for women. At the Paralympics, judo is contested by visually impaired athletes.

Events

These were the 13 judo events, followed by the date they were contested.

Men's 60 kg - September 7
Men's 66 kg - September 7
Men's 73 kg - September 8
Men's 81 kg - September 8
Men's 90 kg - September 9
Men's 100 kg - September 9
Men's +100 kg - September 9
Women's 48 kg - September 7
Women's 52 kg - September 7
Women's 57 kg - September 8
Women's 63 kg - September 8
Women's 70 kg - September 9
Women's +70 kg - September 9

Competitors
There were 129 judoka (82 male, 47 female) taking part.

Medal summary

Medal table
This ranking sorts countries by the number of gold medals earned by their judoka (in this context a country is an entity represented by a National Paralympic Committee). The number of silver medals is taken into consideration next and then the number of bronze medals. If, after the above, countries are still tied, equal ranking is given and they are listed alphabetically.

Men's events

Women's events

See also 
Judo at the 2008 Summer Olympics

References

External links
Official site of the 2008 Summer Paralympics

 
2008
2008 Summer Paralympics events
Paralympics
Judo competitions in China